Femke Maes (born 22 February 1980) is a Belgian former footballer who played as a midfielder.

Career
Maes played for six different clubs and featured in the Belgium national team from 1996 to 2009. She kept the record of top scorer for Belgium until 2015 and still holds the record of most matches .

Honours
RSC Anderlecht
Eerste Klasse: 1994–95, 1996–97, 1997–98
Belgian Cup: 1995–96, 1997–98

Eendracht Aalst
Eerste Klass: 1998–99, 1999–2000, 2000–01, 2001–02
Belgian Cup: 1999–2000, 2001–02

Rapide Wezemaal
Eerste Klass: 2003–04, 2004–05, 2005–06, 2006–07
Belgian Cup: 2002–03, 2003–04, 2006–07

FCR 2001 Duisburg
Bundesliga: runner-up 2009–10
DFB-Pokal: 2008–09, 2009–10
UEFA Women's Cup: 2008–09

Individual
Best player Eerste Klasse: 2004–05, 2006–07
Best player Eredivisie: 2007–08

References

External links
 
 
  

Living people
1980 births
People from Lokeren
Footballers from East Flanders
Belgian women's footballers
Women's association football midfielders
Belgium women's international footballers
Belgium women's youth international footballers
FIFA Century Club
Eredivisie (women) players
Damallsvenskan players
WB Sinaai Girls players
RSC Anderlecht (women) players
Sint-Truidense V.V. (women) players
Willem II (women) players
Djurgårdens IF Fotboll (women) players
FCR 2001 Duisburg players
Belgian expatriate women's footballers
Belgian expatriate sportspeople in the Netherlands
Expatriate women's footballers in the Netherlands
Belgian expatriate sportspeople in Sweden
Expatriate women's footballers in Sweden
Belgian expatriate sportspeople in Germany
Expatriate women's footballers in Germany